In the 1931 Tour de France, for the second year, the race was run in the national team format, with six different teams. Belgium, Italy, Germany and France each sent a team with eight cyclists. Australia and Switzerland sent a combined team, each with four cyclists. The last team was the Spanish team, with only one cyclist. In addition, 40 cyclists joined as touriste-routiers.

The French team was favourite, because they had dominated the 1930 Tour. The most competition was expected from the Belgian team, followed by the Italian team.

By rider

References

1931 Tour de France
1931